Sir Stephen Collins (9 October 1847 – 12 March 1925) was a British Liberal Party politician.

The son of William Collins of Swanage, Dorset, Collins moved to London where he became involved in local politics and was a leading member of the temperance movement. He was twice married: in 1872 to Frances Ann Webber, and following her death to  Jane Russell of Marsworth, Hertfordshire in 1901.

Politics
A member of the Wandsworth District Board he was subsequently elected to represent Kennington on the London County Council and became an alderman on Lambeth Borough Council.

In 1906 he was elected as Liberal MP for Kennington.  He held the seat until 1918.  He received a knighthood in the 1913 Birthday Honours.

Temperance activities
Collins was a member of the Congregationalist Church and a life-long abstainer from alcohol. He was involved in various temperance organisations including the National Temperance League, the Good Templars, the Rechabites and the Band of Hope.

He died at his home, Elm House, Tring, Hertfordshire.

References

External links

1847 births
1925 deaths
Liberal Party (UK) MPs for English constituencies
UK MPs 1906–1910
UK MPs 1910
UK MPs 1910–1918
Members of London County Council
People from Swanage
Knights Bachelor
English temperance activists
Progressive Party (London) politicians
Members of Lambeth Metropolitan Borough Council